The David M. Kennedy Center for International Studies provides international study and service opportunities for students at Brigham Young University (BYU). The center offers six interdisciplinary studies programs: Ancient Near East Studies, Asian Studies, European Studies, International Relations, Latin American Studies, and Middle Eastern Studies/Arabic.  The center also holds conferences, seminars, and weekly forums on international issues designed to prepare students for international careers. As of 2017, the director for the center was Renata Forste.

References

Brigham Young University